What Happened to the Wolf?  is a 2021 Burmese drama film, written and directed by Na Gyi starring Eaindra Kyaw Zin and Paing Phyo Thu. The film was produced by May Sandi Tin Oo, edited by Nyan Wint and background music composed by Myint Than Htun.

The filmmakers of What Happened to the Wolf?, face persecution after the 2021 Myanmar coup ďétat due to the participation in anti-coup movements. This earnest work might seem a bit conventional and saccharine to Western viewers used to out-and-proud queer cinema. But it’s quite radical and brave in the context of its setting in Myanmar, where LGBTQ+ people face legal persecution, prison and state-encouraged violence all the time.

In addition, there’s a horrifying background story attached. The film was made before the military junta seized control of the country early 2021. The director Na Gyi and Paing Phyo Thu, who plays one of the main roles and is married to Na Gyi in real life, have had to go into hiding since they were accused of using their celebrity to oppose the coup. Meanwhile, little is known about what’s happened to Eaindra Kyaw Zin, the film’s other main actor, who was arrested and imprisoned in February, 2021.

What Happened to the Wolf? held its world premiere at Oldenburg International Film Festival 2021 in Oldenburg, Germany. The film was nominated for Best Film and Paing Phyo Thu was nominated for her performance. Eaindra Kyaw Zin won Seymour Cassel Award for Best Performance at Oldenburg International Film Festival for this film.

Plot
Moe (Eaindra Kyaw Zin), the daughter of a wealthy family who built her own successful business, was devastated to learn that she could soon develop lung cancer. At first sight, she tried to commit suicide, by cutting her wrist.

Fortunately, her husband, Ye Moe (Aung Myint Myat), rushed her to the hospital.  She met Way Way (Paing Phyo Thu), a teenager with congenital heart disease. A natural rebel who loved rock music - Anglophone bands like Nirvana in her native language; Way Way was a vicious trouble she didn't care about until she died. She spoke positively and rudely to her brother Min Han (Myanmar Idol's host Kyaw Htet Aung). Poor Min Han cared for her since her parents' shipwreck and abandoned his dream of becoming a medical doctor in hopes of finding a cure for Way Way.

As each woman's health deteriorates, her husband has no reason to inherit her business. Her father is sure to inherit.  But in order to take good care of the police, Moe had to divorce him. Way Way's concept of leaving the love ones unharmed is the lesser people like them, the better when they part the world. That is why Way Way claims to be so cruel to his brother. At that time, the two women were pure friends and set out on a journey to see the famous local beauty of the Sea of Clouds. They did not really kiss the film at the last minute, but it was enough before the February coup that endangered the filmmakers.

Enough given that Way Way's character is an aspiring photographer,  The shooting here is quite lovely;  It explores ventilation, which is full of negative areas that are often disturbed by warm sunlight. Even if the script is too intense, there is warmth between the two lead actors who are committed to their performance.

Cast
Eaindra Kyaw Zin as Myint Myat Moe
Paing Phyo Thu as Way Way
Kyaw Htet Aung as Dr. Min Han
Aung Myint Myat as Ye Moe
Lwin Moe as U Nay Myat Min

Release
The film premiered at the Oldenburg International Film Festival in Germany on September 16, 2021.

It screened at the Dili International Film Festival in Timor-Leste on October 8, 2021.

It screened at the Taiwan International Queer Film Festival in Taiwan on August 28, 2022.

It premiered at the Buffalo International Film Festival in Buffalo, New York, United States on October 10, 2022.

It premiered at the Hobnobben Film Festival in Fort Wayne, Indiana, United States on October 16, 2022.

Awards & nominations

Advisory Board Jury Member, and Award-winning actress, Deborah Kara Unger (Crash, The Game) announced the Seymour Cassel Award at Oldenburg International Film Festival 2021 as follow:

"Acting is reacting. So in this case of an onscreen duo, it is almost impossible to separate the performances of the two lead actresses who take us on a journey to the heart of the puzzle of existence. In Na Gyi's What Happen to the Wolf?, the performances of the two lead actresses, both Myanmar Academy Award winners, leave us breathless. Two characters, one destiny. One is traditional and one is wild. And in stepping back with subtly, humility, and artful discipline, this actress enabled her fellow artist to be free.  We celebrate her elegance, her soul, and her invaluable gift to cinema… with hopes that this reaches her.

It is our honor to present the 2021 SEYMOUR CASSEL AWARD for Outstanding Performance by an actress to Eaindra Kyaw Zin in What Happened to the Wolf? by Na Gyi."

References

External links

What Happened to the Wolf? on FilmFreeway
What Happened to the Wolf? on Facebook

2021 films
2020s Burmese-language films
Burmese drama films
Films shot in Myanmar
2021 drama films